Life is Good: The Best of Stellar Kart is the first compilation and greatest hits album by the Christian pop punk band Stellar Kart.  The album was released on April 21, 2009 under Word Records.  The album includes the greatest hits of the band's career up to 2009, as well as some previously exclusive rarity and bonus tracks.

Critical reception
The album received overall general positive praise from most professional music sites and reviewers.

Kevin Hoskins of Jesus Freak Hideout noted: "If you’re not a fan of Stellar Kart, this album could easily turn you into one, and if you’ve enjoyed the band over the past few years, this is a great addition for your collection. We’re not really sure what the future holds for this four-piece band from Phoenix, but Life is Good is an enjoyable listen for those upbeat summertime parties hanging around the beach. And while there's not a lot of depth here, the tempo is great and the fun is undeniable."

James Doc of Louder Than Music additionally stated: "I think that there are three possible ways to take this album, either you are not really a fan of the punk pop sound and as a result this album isn't really for you. If you like the punk pop genre, like Relient K or Hawk Nelson, then you can swing two ways; there is a very similar sound, there were times when I could  joined a Relient K track in a Stellar Kart track, and as such you could choose to write them off as being 'just another punk pop band'. Alternately, Life is Good provides another great sound to fit well into a summery playlist, alongside other similar bands...I love the way the tracks fit into the same order as their album release, and you can hear the musical progression between the three albums."

A few various reviewers on New Release Tuesday noted that the album was a good option if you hadn't obtained their previous three releases, as it effectively embodied the best from each.

Track listing

Personnel
Stellar Kart
Adam Agee - lead vocals, guitar, keyboards
Cody Pellerin - guitar
Tay Sitera - bass (track 1-4 only)
Brian Calcara - bass (track 5-17 only)
Jordan Messer - drums
Additional production
Stellar Kart - producer (track 1-4 only)
Ian Eskelin - producer (track 5-17 only)
Tim Marshall - compilation producer
Mike Poston - compilation and mastering
Matt Taylor - art direction/design

Music videos

Notes
In 2010, Stellar Kart followed up Life is Good with another compilation album entitled Top 10: Stellar Kart.  The album was of a more concentrated nature and contained ten of the same songs from this release, but in a different track order.
"Punk the Halls", the final track on the album, is the only previously unreleased song on the release, as well as the only Christmas song Stellar Kart has ever published to date.  The track is a bit of a medley, as it contains a piece of the song "O Come, All ye Faithful" as well as numerous references to songs such as: "Silent Night", "It Came Upon the Midnight Clear", "The Little Drummer Boy", "I'll Be Home for Christmas", "It's the Most Wonderful Time of the Year", and "Do You Hear What I Hear?".

References

Stellar Kart albums
2009 greatest hits albums